J. Brent Bill (born 1951 in Columbus, Ohio) is an American author of Quaker spiritual literature. He is a graduate of Wilmington College and Earlham School of Religion and has worked as a pastor and writing coach.

Works 
As editor. 2002. Imagination and Spirit: A Contemporary Quaker Reader 
2005. Holy Silence: The Gift of Quaker Spirituality 
Publishers Weekly described the book as a useful devotional guide and praised it for its "buoyant but realistic tone".
Spiritual Life praised the book for addressing a strongly felt need and described it as helpful to a wide readership. The reviewer noted, however, that the book left him unsatisfied and did not adequately explain the theological framework of the Quakers.
A second edition appeared in 2016: Holy Silence: The Gift of Quaker Spirituality, 2nd Edition 
In a review of the second edition, the Presbyterian Outlook noted that "the Quakers are onto something" when it comes to silence.
The Catholic Library World recommended the book for readers open to that "still, small voice".
 2006. Mind the Light: Learning to See with Spiritual Eyes   
Publishers Weekly described the book as useful but noted that "Bill's plethora of examples of spiritual sight sometimes overwhelm the point he wants to make".
2008. Sacred Compass: The Path of Spiritual Discernment  
With Beth A. Booram. 2011. Awaken Your Senses: Exercises for Exploring the Wonder of God 
In a starred review, Publishers Weekly called the work "a deeply pleasing book" which gracefully accomplishes its goals.
Friends Journal called it a "useful tool" though some of the images did not resonate with the reviewer.
With Jennie Isbell. 2015. Finding God in the Verbs: Crafting a Fresh Language of God 
Publishers Weekly described the book as practical and thought-provoking offering a "fresh, useful approach".
Friends Journal called it an "imperfect but powerful book" with a practical and humorous look at prayer.
2015. Life Lessons from a Bad Quaker: A Humble Stumble toward Simplicity and Grace 
Friends Journal described the book as accessible but also deep and praised the "sweet, serious prose with its simple advice about living in the Spirit." The book placed #5 on the list of "Top Ten Quaker Bestsellers 2018".
Western Friend recommended the book as a useful introduction to Quaker values for Christians of other denominations.
 2019. Beauty, Truth Life, and Love: Four Essentials for the Abundant Life  
 2019. Hope and Witness In Dangerous Times: Lessons from the Quakers on Blending Faith, Daily Life, and Activism  
Friends Journal says "His book not only shares some of the timeless wisdom Quakers have to offer, but it is timely as well." http://www.friendsjournal.org/book/hope-and-witness-in-dangerous-times-lessons-from-the-quakers-on-blending-faith-daily-life-and-activism
 2023. Amity: Stories from the Heartland

References

External links 
Bill's Website
Bill's Blog
Interview with J. Brent Bill on "Sacred Compass" by ReadTheSpirit.com
Interview with Brent Bill Friends Journal, November 1, 2012

1951 births
Living people
American Quakers
Quaker ministers
American religion academics
American religious writers
American spiritual writers
Earlham College alumni
Writers from Columbus, Ohio
Wilmington College (Ohio) alumni
People from Mooresville, Indiana